AQO may refer to:

 Llano Municipal Airport, Texas, United States (IATA code)
 Aluminum Company of America (Alcoa Aircraft Operations), United States (ICAO code)
 Adiabatic Quantum Optimization